William Raphael  (August 22, 1833 – March 15, 1914), born Israel Rafalsky, was a Prussian-born Canadian painter, best known for his lively genre scenes of the Montreal harbour and market life. He was the first Jewish professional artist to establish himself in Canada.

Biography
In 1856, he emigrated to New York City and then went to Montreal in 1857, where he remained for the rest of his life. He worked at Notman`s studio and with A.B. Taber, another photographic firm, during the early years, painting photograph portraits. In time, he became a noted portrait, genre and landscape artist with a wide range of subjects including flora and fauna, religious scenes, as well as making anatomical drawings for medical lectures and publications, illustrations for prints and books such as Picturesque Canada and working as an art restorer. He also taught at the High School of Montreal, the Art Association of Montreal and other schools and colleges as well as starting his own school.

Like Paul Kane and Cornelius Krieghoff, Raphael was known for his paintings of the habitant and First Nations peoples. In 1866, Raphael painted Immigrants at Montreal, later titled Behind Bonsecours Market, purchased by the National Gallery of Canada in 1957. The artist portrayed himself in the painting: he is the man in the crowd carrying a portfolio and a five-pronged candlestick, perhaps inherited from his family (presumably, he was painting what he brought as an immigrant to the New World). He worked and exhibited with the Society of Canadian Artists in Montreal (1867), of which he was a founder, the Art Association of Montreal, the Ontario Society of Artists (member in 1879), and the Royal Canadian Academy, of which he was a charter member. He also exhibited his work at the Centennial Exposition in Philadelphia in 1876, the Royal Society of British Artists in 1877–1878 and at the Colonial and Indian Exhibition in London in 1886. In 1996, Galerie Walter Klinkhoff in Montreal organized a retrospective of his work.

His work is in public collections such as the National Gallery of Canada, the McCord Museum, the Montreal Museum of Fine Arts, the Musée national des beaux-arts du Québec, the Vancouver Art Gallery, and the Château Ramezay. Among his memberships were the Pen and Pencil Club of Montreal in 1890 (he was an original member), and a member of the Council of Arts and Manufactures of the Province of Quebec in 1904.

Gallery

References

Further reading
S. R. Goelman, William Raphael, R.C.A. (1833-1914). M.A. Thesis, Concordia University, Montreal, 1978.

1833 births
1914 deaths
19th-century Canadian painters
19th-century Prussian people
Canadian male painters
20th-century Canadian painters
Artists from Montreal
Canadian people of German-Jewish descent
German emigrants to Canada
19th-century German Jews
Jewish Canadian artists
Jewish painters
People from Nakło nad Notecią
People from West Prussia
20th-century Canadian Jews
19th-century Canadian male artists
20th-century Canadian male artists
Members of the Royal Canadian Academy of Arts
Canadian art educators
Jews and Judaism in Montreal